Douglas Alan Ross  (born 9 May 1948) is a British physicist.   he is Professor Emeritus of physics at the University of Southampton.

Education
Ross was educated at New College, Oxford where he earned his Bachelor of Arts degree in 1969 and a Doctor of Philosophy in 1972, supervised by John Clayton Taylor for research on muon decay.

Research 
Ross is known for his contributions to the development and exploitation of gauge theories, both within and beyond the Standard Model of particle physics. His work has led to the understanding of the renormalisation structure of spontaneously broken theories and to the theoretical properties of the perturbation series in non-Abelian theories. He performed a number of the early perturbative calculations which helped establish quantum chromodynamics as the theory of the strong nuclear force. Among his contributions to physics beyond the Standard Model was the demonstration that the non-observation of proton decay excluded the simplest Grand Unified Theory.

Awards and honours 
Ross was elected a Fellow of the Royal Society (FRS) in 2005.

References

1948 births
Fellows of the Royal Society
British physicists
Alumni of New College, Oxford
Living people
English Jews
Jewish scientists
Academics of the University of Southampton
People associated with CERN